Vision Communications may refer to:
.
Vision Communications (Missouri), R.C. Amer's holding company of KADI-FM and KICK (AM) in Springfield, Missouri
Vision Communications (New York), William Christian's holding company, the assets of which are in the process of folding into Standard Media